Barkerville Airport, formerly , was located  north of Barkerville, British Columbia, Canada.

References

External links
Page about the Barkerville aerodrome on COPA's Places to Fly airport directory

Defunct airports in British Columbia
Cariboo Regional District